Corydon Township is a township in McKean County, Pennsylvania, United States.  The population was 282 at the 2020 census.

History
Corydon was settled in 1810 and incorporated in 1829. On March 26, 1846, a small sliver of the westernmost portion of Corydon bordering the Allegheny River was transferred to Warren County; the new town also retained the name Corydon, resulting in there being two adjacent but separate townships with the same name. The Warren County township of Corydon was flooded and dissolved in 1964.

Notable people

Charles F. Freeman, Wisconsin politician and businessman, was born in the township. Ray Caldwell, baseball star of the early 20th century, was also born in Corydon.

Geography

Demographics

As of the census of 2000, there were 301 people, 122 households, and 85 families residing in the township. The population density was 4.1 people per square mile (1.6/km2). There were 242 housing units at an average density of 3.3/sq mi (1.3/km2). The racial makeup of the township was 99.00% White, 0.33% Asian, and 0.66% from two or more races. Hispanic or Latino of any race were 0.33% of the population.

There were 122 households, out of which 30.3% had children under the age of 18 living with them, 61.5% were married couples living together, 3.3% had a female householder with no husband present, and 30.3% were non-families. 26.2% of all households were made up of individuals, and 9.8% had someone living alone who was 65 years of age or older. The average household size was 2.47 and the average family size was 3.01.

In the township the population was spread out, with 25.6% under the age of 18, 4.3% from 18 to 24, 32.9% from 25 to 44, 25.6% from 45 to 64, and 11.6% who were 65 years of age or older. The median age was 40 years. For every 100 females, there were 115.0 males. For every 100 females age 18 and over, there were 117.5 males.

The median income for a household in the township was $35,208, and the median income for a family was $37,500. Males had a median income of $36,875 versus $29,375 for females. The per capita income for the township was $20,283. About 8.7% of families and 9.8% of the population were below the poverty line, including 9.9% of those under the age of eighteen and 14.3% of those sixty five or over.

References

Populated places established in 1810
Townships in McKean County, Pennsylvania
Townships in Pennsylvania